is a Japanese publisher. It was established in 1886, under the name . In 1999, it was acquired by The Yomiuri Shimbun Holdings, and its name was subsequently changed to Chūōkōron-shinsha.

Profile
It also organizes a variety of prestigious literary awards and prizes across Japan, such as the renowned Chūōkōron Prize.

Among the numerous novels published by the company include Hiroshi Mori's The Sky Crawler series, which was adapted into a 2008 anime film from director Mamoru Oshii. The company has also published numerous manga, including Keiji Nakazawa's famed Barefoot Gen series, Monkey Punch's famed Lupin III series,  Keiko Takemiya's Hensōkyoku, Riyoko Ikeda's noted works The Rose of Versailles, Jotei Ekaterina and Ten no Hate Made: Poland Hishi, Kaoru Kurimoto and Yumiko Igarashi's The Sword of Paros, Go Nagai's Violence Jack, Yoshikazu Yasuhiko's Waga na wa Nero, and numerous others.

References

External links
 Official site
  Wiki collection of bibliographic works on Chuokoron-Shinsha

Book publishing companies in Tokyo
Magazine publishing companies in Tokyo
Publishing companies established in 1886
Comic book publishing companies in Tokyo
Japanese companies established in 1886